The 2015 Toyota Premier Cup was the 5th Toyota Premier Cup. It's a single-game cup competition organized by the Toyota  and Football Association of Thailand. It features BEC Tero Sasana the winners of the 2014 Thai League Cup and Sagan Tosu an invited team from the 2014 J.League Division 1 (Japan). It features at Supachalasai Stadium. It is sponsored by Toyota Motor (Thailand) Co., Ltd.

Details

Assistant referees:
   Amnat Phongmanee
   Kriangsak Kiatsongkram
Fourth official:
   Thitichai Nuanchan

References

News from Siam Sport. BEC Tero Sasana VS. Sagan Tosu

2015
2015